Otnes is a village in Rendalen Municipality in Innlandet county, Norway.

Otnes was the administrative centre of the old municipality of Ytre Rendal which existed from 1880 until 1965 when it was merged into Rendalen. Otnes has one church in the village, Ytre Rendal Church. The tiny village contains a Gas station, Grocery store, small Bank inside the grocery store, Library and a Doctor's office.

References

Rendalen
Villages in Innlandet